Al Ahly Handball Club is one of Al Ahly Sporting Club's sections that represent the club in Egypt as well as in international handball competitions. Al Ahly's Handball team was founded in 1959.
The Al Ahly handball team has participated in the Egyptian Handball League since the beginning in 1960s until the present. The Championship was played under the name of the Republic League. The first championship win for the Al Ahly team in the Egyptian Handball League was in 1968 and 1969. The Al Ahly Handball Club has won the most titles in the league, 23 of which were gold medals. It participated in 6 different championships every season: the Egyptian Handball League, the Egypt cup, the Egyptian Handball Federation, the African Handball Champions League, the African Handball Cup Winners' Cup, and the African Handball Super Cup.

Al Ahly had the best record in the IHF Super Globe when it achieved a silver medal in 2007. For many years, Al Ahly preferred to participate in Arab tournaments instead of African tournaments, causing Al Ahly to remain at the top of Arab handball clubs with 8 total trophies. Al Ahly was the first team to qualify to the African Super Cup in 1994, but it withdrew its participation in Arab Championships.

Al Ahly has had many successful generations of handball, but during the 90s they have had the most success. During this time, they won 6 Egyptian Leagues, 2 Egypt Cups, 2 African Handball Champion Leagues, and 6 Arab Championships, not including the great efforts with the Egypt men's national handball team.

Al Ahly player Gohar Nabil was nominated as the Best Handball Player in the World in 1998 and 2000. Further, Sameh Abdel Warth was chosen at the Handball World Team in 1997.

Men's team honours

National titles

 Egyptian Handball League 23  (Record):
  Champions : 1968–69, 1973–74, 1977–78, 1981–82,  1983–84, 1985–86, 1987–88, 1991–92, 1992–93, 1993–94, 1996–97, 1997–98, 1999–00, 2001–02, 2002–03, 2003–04, 2005–06, 2007–08, 2012–13, 2013–14, 2014–15, 2016–17, 2017–18

 Egypt Handball Cup 9:
 Champions: 1995–96, 1997–98, 1999–00, 2004–05, 2008–09, 2013–14, 2018–19, 2019–20, 2020–21

 Egyptian Federation Handball Cup 3 (Record):
 Champions: 2015, 2016, 2017

 25 January Cup 1 :
 Champions: (played instead of cancelled league due to shortage time after 25 January Revolution and the champion qualify to African Handball Champions League

 Egyptian Excellence Cup 1 :
 Champions: 2002–03

International titles

 IHF Super Globe :
  Runners-up: 2007 (Best African team record in IHF Super Globe)

 African Handball Champions League 5:
 Champions: 1985, 1993, 1994, 2012, 2016

 Runners-up: 2013, 2014, 2018

 African Handball Cup Winners' Cup 4:
 Champions: 2013, 2017, 2018, 2021

 Runners-up: 1985, 2001, 2014, 2015, 2019

 African Handball Super Cup 2  :
 Champions: 2017, 2022

 Runners-up: 2013, 2014, 2018, 2019, 2021

Regional titles
 Arab Handball Championship of Champions 5:
 Champions:  1993, 1994, 1995, 1998, 2010
 Runners-up: 1986, 1999

 Arab Handball Championship of Winners' Cup 3 (Record Shared) :
 Champions: 1996, 1997, 2011
 Runners-up: none

Current squad
Squad for the 2022–2023 season

Goalkeepers
 01  Abdelrahman Mohamed
 16  Abdelrahman Taha
 97  Mohammed Ibrahim
Right Wingers
 19  Omar Sami
 98  Omar Castilo

Left Wingers
 11  Abdel Aziz Ehab
 79  Ahmed Hesham
 04  Islam Rady

Line players
 24  Ibrahim El-Masry
 72  Yasser Seif Eldin
 80  Ahmed Adel
 44  Omar Sherif

Left Backs 	
 07  Mostafa Khalil
 08  Shehab Abdallah
 10  Abdelrahman Abdou 

Central Backs
  09  Islam Hassan
  13  Seif Hany
  17  Ahmed Khairy

Right Backs
 05   Mohsen Ramadan
 48   Mohab Saeed
 55   Mohamed Lashin

Transfers
Transfers for the 2022–23 season

 Joining
  Raul Nantes From  CS Dinamo București 
  Ahmed Khairy From  CS Dinamo București 
  Shehab Abdallah From  Tala'ea El Gaish SC
  Mohammed Ibrahim From  KH Kopřivnice	 

 Leaving
   Oussama Jaziri to ??
  Mahmoud Noaman to ??
   Omar Haggag to ??

Technical and managerial staff

Recent titles

Egyptian league title 

After the equal points of Al Ahly SC and Zamalek SC they played a tiebreak game when Al Ahly won 27-26, and were then announced as the Champion of Egyptian Handball league

The road to 2016 African Handball Champions League

Men's African Competition Records

The "Glory Season" 

In the 2016/2017 season, Al Ahly HB had one of its best seasons when the team won five championships from six competitions competed.

 In the first months of the season, specifically in October 2017, Al Ahly won the 2016 African Handball Champions League in Burkina Faso after beat Espérance de Tunis in the final 26-23 achieving the fifth title in this tournament and the first title of this season.
 In the beginning of 2018 in January specifically Al Ahly crowned the Egyptian Federation Handball Cup after beat Al Gazira in the final and thus Al Ahly added his second title in this season
 In the same month Al Ahly crowned A friendly championship of Alshaab club after the victory over the Algerian GS Pétroliers in the final 28-21, But this friendly Championship is not calculated among the 5 Trophies
 In April 2018 the team won three trophies:
On April 12, in Agadir, Morocco Al Ahly won the 2017 African Handball Super Cup after beat Zamalek SC 29-23, this was the third title of Al Ahly in the season
On April 22, Al Ahly won the 2017 African Handball Cup Winners' Cup after beat AS Hammamet in the final 31-22, this was the fourth title of this season
On April 30, Al Ahly won the Egyptian Handball League after beating Sporting SC in the 24th round, Al Ahly had 24 wins in row (without any loss or a draw), this was the fifth title in this great season.

Head coaches
This is a list of the senior team's head coaches in the recent years.

Al Ahly in Super Globe Championship
→ Al Ahly participate 4 times in IHF Super Globe. Al Ahly Hosted the IHF Super Globe 2007 In Al ahly hall in Gezira

2007 IHF Super Globe
This competition was held in league format, and 5 teams took part.
Al Ahly Fixtures was:

Final Ranking:

2015 IHF Super Globe
This competition was held in Knock out format starting form Quarter Finals, and 8 teams participated in this competition. Al Ahly Fixtures was:

 Final ranking

2017 IHF Super Globe 
 Al Ahly  Qualified to super globe after beat Zamalek SC in the 2017 African Handball Super Cup but later withdraw due to Political problems with Host Country Qatar . and Espérance participate instead of Al Ahly sc

2022 IHF Men's Super Globe
 Al Ahly  Qualified to super globe after beat Zamalek SC in the 2022 African Handball Super Cup 32-31 
The draw was held on 29 September 2022. and put Al Ahly beside both of  SL Benfica and  Mudhar 
Group B

Championship bracket

Semifinals

Third place game

Final ranking

Kit manufacturers and shirt sponsors

Notable players

 01-  Hassan Moustafa 
 02-  Gamal Shams
 03-  Mohamed ElAlfey
 04-  Yasser Labib
 05-  Assem El Saadney
 06-  khaled ElAwady
 07-  Sameh Abdel wareth
 08-  Ashraf Awad
 09-  Hazem Awad
 10-  Gohar Nabil

 11-  Hany Elfakarney
 12-   Ashraf Shokrey 
 13-   Atef Abdelrahman 
 14-   Mahmoud Ashour 
 15-   Saber Heussin 
 16-   Ahmed Salem 
 17-   Mamdouh seleman 
 18-   Tarek el dorey
 19-   Karim Elsaaeed 
 20-   Karim shokrey 
 21-   Ayman ElAlfey

Club Presidents

See also
 Al Ahly FC
 Al Ahly (volleyball)
 Al Ahly Women's Volleyball
 Al Ahly (basketball)
 Al Ahly Women's Basketball
 Al Ahly (handball)
 Al Ahly Women's Handball
 Al Ahly (table tennis)
 Al Ahly (water polo)
 Port Said Stadium riot
 Al-Ahly TV

External links
Twitter Account
Facebook Account
Al Ahly website
Fan website
Fan page

References

H
Egyptian handball clubs